Riebiņi Parish is an administrative unit of Preiļi Municipality in the Latgale region of Latvia. At the beginning of 2014, the population of the parish was 1443. The administrative center is Riebiņi village.

Towns, villages and settlements of Riebiņi Parish 
 Kokorīši
 Ondzuļi
 Opūgi
 Pieniņi
 Riebiņi
 Sprindži

References

External links 
 

Parishes of Latvia
Preiļi Municipality
Latgale